Victoria was one of the nine district electoral areas (DEA) in Belfast, Northern Ireland, from 1985 to 2014, when it was mostly replaced by the Ormiston district.

Located in the east of the city, the district elected seven members to Belfast City Council and contained the wards of Ballyhackamore; Belmont; Cherryvalley; Island; Knock; Stormont; and Sydenham. Victoria, along with wards from the neighbouring Pottinger district and Castlereagh Borough Council, formed the Belfast East constituency for the Northern Ireland Assembly and UK Parliament.

The district was bounded to the west by the Victoria Channel, to the north by Belfast Lough, to the northeast by North Down Borough Council, to the south and east by Castlereagh Borough Council and to the southwest by the Newtownards Road.

History
The DEA was created for the 1985 local elections as the successor to the former Area B, which all seven wards in the new Victoria had been part of. An eighth ward, Bloomfield, which had been in Area B, was placed in the new Pottinger electoral area. It was abolished in 2015, making way for the new DEAs that were used for the 2014 local elections. It was largely replaced by the new Ormiston District Electoral Area. Five of Victoria's wards joined Ormiston, with the Sydenham ward and the areas which had been part of the abolished Island ward becoming part of the new Titanic District Electoral Area.

The district contained many key pieces of Belfast's transport infrastructure, including George Best Belfast City Airport and the eastern portion of Belfast Harbour. The area is served by the Bridge End and Sydenham railway stations and the A2 and A20 major road routes. The district is also home to Parliament Buildings, the meeting place of the Northern Ireland Assembly.

Victoria was once the site of much of Belfast's heavy industrial manufacturing facilities, however these have suffered a significant decline since the mid-twentieth century, although companies such as Short Brothers and Harland and Wolff continue to have significant operations in the area.

Former BCDR mainline
The Belfast and County Down Railway had a mainline through Knock railway station which linked Belfast direct to Downpatrick railway station as well as to Newcastle, County Down, there was also the branch from Comber railway station to Newtownards and Donaghadee. The mainline opened in 1850 was closed in 1950 by the Ulster Transport Authority.

Titanic-quarter

The Titanic Quarter is a major economic and cultural regeneration programme that is centred on Queen's Island and the former Harland and Wolff shipyard. The project has seen the construction of new hotels, apartment blocks and business facilities, with a number of high-profile relocations, including the Public Record Office of Northern Ireland. The area has also become a centre for learning and research with the opening of the Catalyst Inc, in addition to Belfast Metropolitan College moving one of its key city centre campuses to the Quarter, while Queen's University Belfast have also located their Institute of Electronics, Communications and Information Technology (ECIT) within the Science Park. The Quarter's name comes from the RMS Titanic which was constructed in the old shipyard, with a number of projects aimed at exploiting the tourism value of the Titanic's connection to Belfast, including the Samson and Goliath cranes used to construct the ship and the Paint Hall.

Other amenities

Other amenities in the Victoria district electoral area include:
 Ashfield Boys' High School
 Campbell College
 The Comber Greenway, a  traffic-free section of the National Cycle Network, along the old Belfast-Comber railway line
 HMS Caroline
 Holywood Exchange, a major retail development
 Odyssey Arena, a major entertainment complex
 Our Lady and St. Patrick's College, Knock
 The Oval Stadium, home ground of Glentoran F.C.
 Stormont Estate
Dundonald House
Stormont Castle
Stormont House
 Strandtown Primary School
 Strathearn School
 Wilgar Park, the home ground of Dundela F.C.

Wards

Councillors

2011 elections

See also
Belfast City Council
Electoral wards of Belfast
Local government in Northern Ireland
Members of Belfast City Council
Belfast Victoria (Northern Ireland Parliament constituency)
Belfast Victoria (UK Parliament constituency)

References

Former District Electoral Areas of Belfast
1985 establishments in Northern Ireland
2014 disestablishments in Northern Ireland